Ealhmund was King of Kent in 784.  He is reputed to be the father of King Egbert who was King of Wessex and, later, King of Kent. Asser's The Life of King Alfred identifies him as the son of Eafa.

Biography
He is not known to have struck any coins, and the only contemporary evidence of him is an abstract of a charter dated 784, in which Ealhmund granted land to the Abbot of Reculver. In this charter he is identified as Ealmundus rex Canciæ. By the following year Offa of Mercia seems to have been ruling directly, as he issued a charter without any mention of a local king.

General consensus among historians is this is the same Ealhmund found in two pedigrees in the Winchester (Parker) Chronicle, compiled during the reign of Alfred the Great.  The genealogical preface to this manuscript, as well as the annual entry (covering years 855–859) describing the death of Æthelwulf, both make King Egbert of Wessex the son of an Ealhmund, who was son of Eafa, grandson of Eoppa, and great-grandson of Ingild, the brother of King Ine of Wessex, and descendant of founder Cerdic, and therefore a member of the House of Wessex (see House of Wessex family tree). A further entry has been added in a later hand to the 784 annal, reporting Ealhmund's reign in Kent.

Finally, in the Canterbury Bilingual Epitome, originally compiled after the Norman conquest of England, a later scribe has likewise added to the 784 annal not only Ealhmund's reign in Kent, but his explicit identification with the father of Egbert.  Based on this reconstruction, in which a Wessex scion became King of Kent, his own Kentish name and that of his son, Egbert, it has been suggested that his mother derived from the royal house of Kent, a connection dismissed by a recent critical review.

Historian Heather Edwards has suggested that Ealhmund was probably a Kentish royal scion, whose pedigree was forged to give his son Egbert the descent from Cerdic requisite to reigning in Wessex.

Issue
Ealhmund's wife is not known; he is identified as the father of: 
Ecgberht, King of Wessex
Æthelburh of Wilton, wife of Wulfstan, ealdorman of Wiltshire

See also
List of monarchs of Kent

Notes

References
Asser, John, The Life of King Alfred, https://archive.org/details/asserslifeofking00asseiala/page/1/mode/1up
Bierbrier, M.L., "Genealogical Flights of Fancy. Old Assumptions, New Sources", Foundations: Journal of the Foundation for Medieval Genealogy, 2:379–87.
 
Garmonsway, G.N. ed., The Anglo-Saxon Chronicle, London: J. M. Dent & Sons, Ltd.

Kelley, David H., "The House of Aethelred", in Brooks, Lindsay L., ed., Studies in Genealogy and Family History in Tribute to Charles Evans. Salt Lake City: The Association for the Promotion of Scholarship in Genealogy, Occasional Publication, No. 2, pp. 63–93.

External links
 
 Anglo-Saxon Chronicle Year 784 Mention of his reign.

Kentish monarchs
780s deaths
8th-century English monarchs
Year of birth unknown
Year of death uncertain